Eduardo Alanís Guerrero (born 1 May 1950 in Mexico City) is a Mexican former swimmer who competed in the 1968 Summer Olympics.

References

External links

1950 births
Living people
Mexican male swimmers
Swimmers from Mexico City
Mexican male freestyle swimmers
Male medley swimmers
Olympic swimmers of Mexico
Swimmers at the 1968 Summer Olympics
Central American and Caribbean Games gold medalists for Mexico
Competitors at the 1970 Central American and Caribbean Games
Central American and Caribbean Games medalists in swimming